Kozani Football Club is a Greek football club from Kozani, Greece. The club was founded in April 1964 in Kozani, Greece following the merger between Makedonikos and Olympiakos Kozanis and since then it has won the Delta Ethniki a record 5 times. The club plays in the Gamma Ethniki, the third tier of Greek football. Kozani FC presently plays at the Kozani Stadium in Kozani.

History
The football section of Kozani is one of the sections in sports that hasn't achieved a lot in the Greek football league for the city of Kozani, resulting the team to be 3 times champions in the Fourth Division (1995,1997 and 2004) and win the promotion to the Third Division with some good performances in the past years. The best recent year in the Third Division was actually in 1999-2000 where they finished 3rd, behind Akratito and Nafpaktiako who were promoted. They also finished 3rd three more times in 1988, 1990 and 1998 where they lost promotion in the last games. They haven't played in the Beta Ethniki though with the existing format, although the last time they participated in the Beta Ethniki was in 1982-83 when the second division had two groups of 20 teams each.

After the 2005-06 season, the club, was relegated to Delta Ethniki after failing to win the last game away at Drama. However, the crucial match tο avoid the relegation was against Polykastro at home where the team drew 1-1 instead of winning and staying in the division.

In the 2006–07 season, the club played in the Delta Ethniki where it finished in the 8th place.
In the 2007–08 season, the club remained another year in the Delta Ethniki and finished 3rd.
In the 2008–09 season, the club played again in the Delta Ethniki and won promotion to the Gamma Ethniki.
In the 2009–10 season, the club finished 13th in the North Group and remained in the Gamma Ethniki. In the 2010–11 season, the club finished 16th and relegated to Delta Ethniki. In the 2011–12 season, the club played in the Delta Ethniki where it finished in the 4th place. In the 2012–13 season, the club won promotion to the Gamma Ethniki. During the 2013–14 season they competed in the Gamma Ethniki, where they gained the fourth position. The following year (2014–15) they were ranked 10th in the same championship. After a disappointing season, Kozani finished 10th in the 2015–16 Gamma Ethniki in the Group 1, and the club was relegated to Kozani FCA championship. In the 2019-20 seasaon, the club won the promotion to the Gamma Ethniki.

Crest and colours
In the emblem the team kept the date both teams were founded in 1928 and took the colours of Olympiakos, the red and Makedonikos, the white. The emblem of Kozani is the big clock of the Town Hall on a red background.

Rivalries
Kozani has long-standing rival with Eordaikos, from the neighbouring city of Ptolemaida 
.

Stadium

Kozani plays its home games at the Municipal Stadium of Kozani (Δημοτικό Στάδιο Κοζάνης), located in the southwest part of Kozani. The stadium holds 4,000 and was built in 1955. It also features projectors for night races.

Supporters
Kozani's fans named The Lions

Honours

Leagues 
Third Division
Winners (1): 2021–22
Fourth Division
Winners (6): 1980–81, 1994–95, 1996–97, 2003–04, 2008–09, 2012–13
Kozani FCA Championship
Winner (1): 2019–20

Cups 
 Greek Football Amateur Cup
 Winner (1): 1992-93
Kozani FCA Cup
Winners (4): 1992–93, 1994–95, 2007–08, 2012-13
Kozani FCA Super Cup
Winner (1): 2020

Seasons in the 21st century 

Promotion in bold.

Key: GS = Group Stage, 1R = First Round, 2R = Second Round, 3R = Third Round, 4R = Fourth Round.

Players

Current squad

Notable Players
 Andreas Govas

Sponsorships
Great Shirt Sponsor: Kiefer
Sport Clothing Manufacturer: Macron

References

External links

Association football clubs established in 1928
Football clubs in Western Macedonia
1928 establishments in Greece
Gamma Ethniki clubs